The Struve Putsch, also known as the Second Baden Uprising (Zweiter badischer Aufstand) or Second Baden Rebellion (Zweite badische Schilderhebung), was a regional, South Baden element of the German Revolution of 1848/1849. It began with the proclamation of the German Republic on 21 September 1848 by Gustav Struve in Lörrach and ended with his arrest on 25 September 1848 in Wehr.

References

Literature 
 Gustav Struve: Geschichte der drei Volkserhebungen in Baden. Verlag von Jenni, Sohn, Berne, 1849. (amended reprint: Verlag Rombach, Freiburg i.Br. 1980, pp. 118–145)
 Moritz Wilhelm von Löwenfels, Friedrich Neff, G. Thielmann: Der zweite republikanische Aufstand in Baden : nebst einigen Enthüllungen über das Verbleiben der republikanischen Kassen. Basle, 1848, pp. 31–39. (online bei der Badischen Landesbibliothek)
 Theodor Mögling: Briefe an seine Freunde. Solothurn, 1858. (online at Google Books)
 Amalie Struve: Erinnerungen aus den badischen Freiheitskämpfen. Hamburg, 1850. (reprint in: Heftiges Feuer. Freiburg im Breisgau, Rombach, 1998)
 Johann Baptist Bekk: Die Bewegung in Baden von Ende des Februar 1848 bis zur Mitte des Mai 1849. Mannheim 1850, pp. 183–200. (online at the Bavarian State Library)
 Paul Siegfried: Basel während des zweiten und dritten badischen Aufstandes 1848/49. 106. Neujahrsblatt der GGG. Basle, 1928.
 Eduard Kaiser: Aus alten Tagen. Lebenserinnerungen eines Markgräflers. Lörrach 1910. (new edition: Weil am Rhein 1981, pp. 258–266)
 Alfred Grosch: Der erste Schwurgerichtsfall in Baden, verhandelt zu Freiburg i. Br. vom 20. bis 30. März 1849. In: Schau-ins-Land, Vol. 41 (1914), pp. 95-108 online at UB Freiburg
 Emil Stärk: Rund um den Struve-Putsch vom September 1848 [Staufen]. In: Schau-ins-Land, Band 76 (1958), pp. 110-119online at UB Freiburg

German revolutions of 1848–1849
Grand Duchy of Baden
Lörrach (district)
1848 in the Grand Duchy of Baden
Struve family